Kurri Kurri was an electoral district of the Legislative Assembly in the Australian state of New South Wales created in 1927, with the abolition of the multi-member electorates of Newcastle and Maitland and named after the Hunter Region town of Kurri Kurri. It was abolished in 1968 and replaced by Wallsend.

Kurri Kurri was a safe  seat and was only held by a Labor candidate. Of the 15 elections, the Labor was unopposed at 6 elections, and a  candidate contested 7 elections with a highest vote of 14.8% at the 1935 election. The closest contest was the 1956 election, the only occasion in which a conservative party fielded a candidate, when  candidate Stanley Mettam achieved 15.6% of the vote.

George Booth represented the district for more than 30 years, and when he died was succeeded by his son Ken.

Members for Kurri Kurri

Election results

References

Former electoral districts of New South Wales
1927 establishments in Australia
Constituencies established in 1927
1968 disestablishments in Australia
Constituencies disestablished in 1968